was a deputy-shōgun of the Hosokawa clan of Japan, and son of Hosokawa Katsumoto. Masamoto was appointed to this rank during 1486.  For a brief period this title was lost by Hatakeyama Masanaga but was regained in time.  When Ashikaga Yoshihisa died childless during the year of 1489, Masamoto supported the nomination of Ashikaga Yoshizumi as successor in opposition to Ashikaga Yoshitane. Masamoto thought that the post of deputy-shogun would return to Hosokawa Masanaga due to Yoshitane's closeness with Hatakeyama Masanaga and his own objections to Yoshitane's rise. During Masanaga's struggle with a rival branch of the Hatakeyama clan, Yoshitane led troops to the assistance of Masanaga. Masamoto then assisted his force to the Hatakeyama, ultimately defeating those of Masanaga and Yoshitane. Masanaga killed himself during the battle and Yoshitane became a prisoner at Kyoto. His childhood name was Sumiakamaru (聡明丸).

Masamoto exiled Yoshitane and made Ashikaga Yoshizumi the successor. However, Yoshizumi would be played as one of Masamoto's puppets. The same year Masamoto led a campaign against his opponents of Yamashiro Province. Masamoto who was childless (many who thought was a homosexual) then adopted Sumiyuki and Sumimoto as his sons. The retainers of Hosokawa then disputed for very long to who the successor of the Hosokawa would be. In 1504, Masamoto eliminated Yakushiji Motoichi who was a follower of Sumimoto (whom he did not want as successor). In 1506, Masamoto was threatened by an army led by Miyoshi Yukinaga, another supporter of Sumimoto. Due to Masamoto then choosing someone else as the successor, Kosai Motonaga, along with Sumiyuki, broke into the house of Masamoto during the year 1507 and killed him while he was taking a bath.

Family
 Father: Hosokawa Katsumoto
 Mother: daughter of Yamana Sōzen
Sister: Tōshōin
 Adopted Sons:
 Hosokawa Sumiyuki (1489–1507)
 Hosokawa Sumimoto
 Hosokawa Takakuni

References

1466 births
1507 deaths
Daimyo
Keichō-Hosokawa clan
Japanese murder victims
People murdered in Japan